Stade Saint-Germain was a French football club active between 1904 and 1970, at which time it merged with Paris FC in 1970 to form Paris Saint-Germain. It was based in the town of Saint-Germain-en-Laye.

The club's best performance in the Coupe de France was in 1968–69, when it reached the quarter-finals of the competition before losing to Marseille.

Notable former players 

  Camille Choquier
  Bernard Guignedoux
  Roger Quenolle
  Pierre Phelipon

References

Paris Saint-Germain F.C.
Defunct football clubs in France
Association football clubs established in 1904
1904 establishments in France
Association football clubs disestablished in 1970
1970 disestablishments in France
Sport in Yvelines
Football clubs in Île-de-France